Townley is a surname. Notable people with the surname include:

A. C. Townley (1880–1959), American political organizer, founder the National Non-Partisan League
Alvin Townley (born 1975), American author who writes about adventure with a greater purpose
Athol Townley (1905–1963), Australian politician and Minister for Defence
Ben Townley (born 1984), professional motocross rider originating from Taupo, New Zealand
Charles Townley (1737–1805), English country gentleman, antiquary and collector of the Townley Marbles
Charles Townley (officer of arms) (1713–1774), long-serving officer of arms at the College of Arms in London
Doody Townley (born 1925), driver of standardbred racehorses in New Zealand
Fred Townley, architect who designed many buildings in Vancouver, Canada
Frederick Townley-Smith (1887–1961), Co-operative Commonwealth Federation member of the Canadian House of Commons
George Townley (1891–1977), the sixth Bishop of Hull in the modern era from 1957 until 1965
Henry Townley Heald (1904–1975), president of Armour Institute of Technology from 1938 to 1940
Jack Townley (1897–1960), American screenwriter
James Townley (1714–1778), English dramatist and anonymous playwright
Jimmy Townley (1902–1983), English professional footballer
John Townley (born 1945), musician who was a member of the folk-rock group The Magicians from 1965 to 1966
John Wes Townley (born 1989), former NASCAR Nationwide Series driver
Jonathan Townley Crane (1819–1880), American clergyman, author and abolitionist
Max Townley (1864–1942), British land agent, agriculturist and politician
Michael Townley, US citizen living in the United States under terms of the federal witness protection program
Michael Townley (politician) (born 1934), former Tasmanian senator
Rex Townley (1904–1982), Australian politician who served as leader of the Liberal Party in Tasmania from 1950 to 1956
Richard Greaves Townley (1786–1855), English Whig politician
Richard Townley (died 1711), the 8th son of Nicholas Townley of Littleton and Joanne White
Robert Townley Caldwell, the Master of Corpus Christi College, Cambridge from 1906 to 1914
Roderick Townley (born 1942), American author of juvenile, young adult, and adult books
Sidney Dean Townley (1867–1946), American astronomer and geodeticist
Simon Townley, piano player and composer
Thomas Townley (1862–1935), Canadian lawyer and the eighth Mayor of Vancouver, British Columbia
Thomas Townley (cricketer) (1825–1895), English soldier, cricketer and amateur jockey
Toke Townley, (1912–1984), English actor
Sir Walter Townley (1863–1945), British ambassador
William Townley, (1866–1950), English football (soccer) player and coach
William Townley Mitford (1817–1889), Victorian Conservative Party politician in Britain
Winfield Townley Scott (1910–1968), American poet, critic and diarist

See also 
 Towneley family